The 18th Goya Awards took place at the Palacio Municipal de Congresos in Madrid on 31 January 2004. The gala was hosted by Cayetana Guillén Cuervo and Diego Luna.

Take My Eyes (Te doy mis ojos) won 7 Goyas, the most awards in the ceremony, including those for Best Film, Director, Actor (Tosar), Actress (Marull) and Supporting Actress (Peña).

Winners and nominees
The winners and nominees are listed as follows:

Major award nominees

Other award nominees

Honorary Goya
 Héctor Alterio

References

18
2003 film awards
2003 in Spanish cinema
2004 in Madrid